8th SDFCS Awards
December 18, 2003

Best Film: 
 Dirty Pretty Things 
The 8th San Diego Film Critics Society Awards, given by the San Diego Film Critics Society on 18 December 2003, honored the best in film for 2003.

Winners
Best Actor: 
Chiwetel Ejiofor - Dirty Pretty Things
Best Actress: 
Naomi Watts - 21 Grams
Best Animated Film: 
The Triplets of Belleville (Les triplettes de Belleville)
Best Cinematography: 
Girl with a Pearl Earring - Eduardo Serra
Best Director: 
Peter Jackson - The Lord of the Rings: The Return of the King
Best Documentary Film: 
Rivers and Tides
Best Editing: 
Kill Bill: Volume 1 - Sally Menke
Best Film: 
Dirty Pretty Things
Best Foreign Language Film (tie): 
The Barbarian Invasions (Les invasions barbares) • Canada/France
Irreversible (Irréversible) • France
Best Production Design: 
The Lord of the Rings: The Return of the King - Grant Major
Best Screenplay - Adapted: 
American Splendor- Shari Springer Berman and Robert Pulcini
Best Screenplay - Original: 
The Magdalene Sisters - Peter Mullan
Best Supporting Actor: 
Djimon Hounsou - In America
Best Supporting Actress: 
Renée Zellweger - Cold Mountain

2
2003 film awards
2003 in American cinema